Sex, Drugs, & Hip-Hop is a mixtape by rapper Tony Yayo. The mixtape features exclusive tracks from Tony Yayo with appearances by Bun B, Ron Browz, Slim Thug, Coolio, Lloyd Banks, Danny Brown and others. It was released for digital download on July 30, 2012 on datpiff.

Track list

2012 mixtape albums
Tony Yayo albums